The Chester Blue Stockings was the initial moniker of the minor league baseball teams based in Chester, Pennsylvania between 1884 and 1912. The Chester teams played as members of the Keystone Association (1884–1885), Pennsylvania State League (1901), Pennsylvania League (1904), Atlantic League (1907), Pennsylvania-New Jersey League (1908) and Tri-State League (1912).

History
The Keystone Association and the member teams were formed at a March 3, 1884 meeting in Lancaster, Pennsylvania, Carlisle, Pennsylvania and West Chester, Pennsylvania were franchises admitted to the league but never played.

The Chester Blue Stockings began play in 1884, as the Keystone Association played as a five–team Independent league. The other Keystone Association franchises were based in Chambersburg, Pennsylvania, Lancaster, Pennsylvania, Littlestown, Pennsylvania and York, Pennsylvania.

The Chester Blue Stockings began Keystone Association play on May 2, 1884. During the 1884 season, the Chester franchise disbanded on June 2, 1884. On June 10, 1884, the league folded for the season with the Blue Stockings in 4th place, 6.5 games behind 1st place Lancaster, playing under manager Thomas Hargraves. The League standings when the league folded were Lancaster Red Stockings (15–4), York White Roses (10–10), Chambersburg (8–10), Chester Blue Stockings (8–10) and Littlestown Brown Stockings (6–8). Lancaster disbanded on June 7, 1884, causing the rest of the league to fold.

The 1885 Chester Blue Stockings returned to Keystone Association play, as the league featured the same five returning franchises. Chambersburg, the Chester Blue Stockings, Lancaster Red Stockings, Littlestown Brown Stockings and York White Roses all returned as 1885 league members. The 1885 league records and standings are unknown. The 1885 Keystone Association final team standings are unknown.

Chester returned to play as members of the 1901 Class D level Pennsylvania State League. 1901 league records and standings are unknown. Jesse Frysinger managed the Chester team.

In 1904, the Chester team played as members of the Independent level Pennsylvania League. League standings for the six–team league are unknown.

The Chester team played in the 1907 Independent level Atlantic League. The Tamaqua, Pennsylvania franchise combined with Chester. Joseph Senior, John Castle, Jack Quinn and James McGeehan were the managers. League standings and records for the six–team league are unknown.

The 1908 Chester team became members of the Independent level Pennsylvania-New Jersey League. Chester had an 8–3 record to finish in 2nd place under manager Steve Yerkes. Trenton finished 1st in the six–team league, percentage points ahead of Chester.

In 1912, Chester played briefly as members of the Tri-State League. The Johnstown Johnnies moved to Chester on August 2, 1912 with a record of 25–60. The Johnstown/Chester team ended the 1912 season with a record of 31–81, placing 8th in the standings. Bert Conn and Curt Wiegand served as managers.

Chester folded following the 1912 season. Chester, Pennsylvania has not hosted another minor league team.

The ballpark
The Chester minor league teams were noted to have played home games at Union Park. Still in use as a public park, the park is now named Veterans Memorial Park, Chester, Pennsylvania.

Timeline

Year-by-year records

Notable alumni

Frank Berkelbach (1884)
Bert Conn (1912, MGR)
Snake Deal (1901)
John Deasley (1884)
Bill Farmer (1884)
Harry Felix (1901)
Paddy Greene (1901)
Bill Jones (1884)
Charlie Jordan (1901)
Phil Ketter (1912)
Joe Knotts (1904)
Mike Mowrey (1904)
Fred Odwell (1901)
Cub Stricker (1901)
Jesse Whiting (1901)

See also
Chester (minor league baseball) players, Chester Blue Stockings players, Chester Johnnies players

References

Defunct baseball teams in Pennsylvania
Baseball teams established in 1884
Baseball teams disestablished in 1885
Keystone Association teams
1885 disestablishments in Pennsylvania
Chester, Pennsylvania
Delaware County, Pennsylvania